Edward Linley Sambourne (4 January 18443 August 1910) was an English cartoonist and illustrator most famous for being a draughtsman for the satirical magazine Punch for more than forty years and rising to the position of "First Cartoonist" in his final decade. He was also a great-grandfather of Antony Armstrong-Jones, 1st Earl of Snowdon, who was the husband of Princess Margaret.

Early life and education

Edward Linley Sambourne was born in the family home at 15 Lloyd Square in Pentonville, London 4 January 1844. He was the only surviving child of Edward Mott Sambourne, a furrier merchant in the City of London. His mother Frances Linley was the daughter of Peter Linley, who followed into the family business of scythe manufacture near Sheffield.

Linley was educated at various schools throughout England. Aged 10 or 11 he enrolled as a pupil in the City of London School, but by 1857 he was at a school in Sheffield. From late 1857 to 1860 he had again enrolled in a new school, the Chester Training College, where he was encouraged to pursue his talent for drawing. In 1860, aged 16, Linley enrolled in the South Kensington School of Art but only stayed a couple of months.

Punch

In 1861 Sambourne was apprenticed to John Penn & Son, marine engineers of Greenwich. Initially he worked under the founder's son, John Penn Jr, but was moved to the drawing office when his employer discovered his aptitude for draft drawing. In his spare time Sambourne continued to draw caricatures and study the great graphic artists such as William Hogarth and Albrecht Dürer. One version Sambourne recounts about the events leading to his introduction to Punchs editor Mark Lemon is that his friend and fellow employee at Penn's, Alfred German Reed, showed one of his sketches to his father, the theatrical impresario Thomas German Reed. At his son's urging Thomas passed the drawing on to Mark Lemon. Lemon was sufficiently impressed by the sketch that he encouraged Sambourne to take art lessons and consult the engraver Joseph Swain about drawing on wood. Pleased with the results, Lemon published a drawing by Sambourne in the 27 April 1867 issue of Punch. This was an initial letter 'T' showing the politician John Bright striking a quintain.

Initially employed on a casual basis by Lemon, Sambourne was asked to supply the decorated initial letters that stood at head of articles, stories and poems incorporating the first letter into a fanciful design. Between 1867 and 1874 Sambourne contributed 350 initial letters. Although Sambourne's distinctive style emerged only slowly, he became a regular staff member of Punch in 1871. At the beginning he made his name by his "social" drawings while continuing to provide his highly elaborated initial letters. He drew his first political cartoon, properly so-called, in 1884, and ten years later began regularly to design the weekly second cartoon. At the end of  John Tenniel's long occupancy in 1901, he became the magazine's chief principal cartoonist.

Unusually for an artist working in black and white, Sambourne used a huge library of photographic images to give accuracy to his work, which was characterized by a vivid and decisive linearity as well as an artistic inventiveness that took his images far beyond the simple concept of a cartoon or "comic cut". The quality of his work for Punch was acknowledged by the Royal Academy, which exhibited his drawings over a 20-year period.

Other works

While his work for Punch occupied most of his energy, it was not Sambourne's only source of income, as he would often accept commissions for individuals, books, magazines and advertisements. These include:Book illustrations Military Men I have met ..., Edward Dyne Fenton, 1872
 Our Autumn Holiday on French Rivers ..., James Lynam Molly, 1874
 Our Holiday in the Scottish Highlands, Arthur à Beckett, 1876
 The Royal Umbrella. [A tale.] ..., Alfred Frederick Pollock Harcourt, 1879
 The Modern Arabian Nights, Arthur a' Beckett, 1877
 Poems of Edgar Allan Poe, 1881
 The Water Babies, Charles Kingsley, 1885
 Sherryana, F. W. Cosens, 1886
 Friends and Foes from Fairy Land, Edward Knatchbull-Hugessen, 1886
 The Green Above The Red: More Blarney Ballads, Charles L. Graves, 1889
 The Real Adventures of Robinson Crusoe, F. C. Burnand, 1893DiplomaInternational Fisheries Exhibition Diploma, 1883–84, referred to by the Encyclopædia Britannica Eleventh Edition, as "of its kind one of the most extraordinary things in English art".Invitations Invitation to the Lord Mayor's Banquet, 1888Advertisements Apenta aperient water
 Philip Morris cigarettes, 1889
 Rose's lime juice
 Mazawatte tea
 Lancashire RailwayCovers The Naval and Military Gazette
 The Pall Mall Gazette
 The Sketch
 The SphereIllustrations'''
 Black and White, 1891
 The British Workman
 The Illustrated London News
 The Piccadilly Magazine
 The Pictorial World

Examples of his work
Examples from his series of caricatures in Punch 1881–82,  "Punch's Fancy Portraits":

More of Sambourne's caricatures from this series can be seen in the articles for 
William Harrison Ainsworth, 
Emma Albani, 
Matthew Arnold, 
Lord Charles Beresford,
William Black,
George Granville Bradley, 
Robert Browning, 
Hugh Childers,
Lord Randolph Churchill, 
Henry Drummond Wolff,
Henry Fawcett, 
James Anthony Froude,
George Joachim Goschen, 
Charles Gounod, 
John Holker, 
Henry Labouchère,
Henry Parry Liddon,
John Lubbock, 1st Baron Avebury, 
Henry Edward Manning,
Oscar Wilde,
Ouida, 
James Payn, 
George Augustus Henry Sala, 
Eyre Massey Shaw,
Arthur Sullivan,
William James Erasmus Wilson,
and
Garnet Wolseley, 1st Viscount Wolseley

See also: Phylloxera, Cecil Rhodes.

Descendants
Edward Linley Sambourne married Mary Ann (Marion) Herapath (1851–1914) in 1874. She was the eldest daughter of the nine children of Spencer Herapath, a successful stockbroker, and his wife Mary Ann Walker. The couple had two children: Maud (born 1875) and Mawdley, also known as Roy (born 1878).

Mawdley (Roy) Herapath Sambourne (1878–1946) did not marry. In 1898 his sister Maud Frances Sambourne (1875–1960) married Leonard Messel, a young stockbroker and collector. They had three children: Linley (born 1899), Anne born 1902 (first married to Major Ronald Armstrong-Jones, later to Michael Parsons, 6th Earl of Rosse), and  Oliver Messel (an acclaimed set designer and architect) born 1904.

Further descendants of Edward Linley Sambourne include: his great-grandson Antony Armstrong-Jones, 1st Earl of Snowdon (the photographer and documentary filmmaker), and great-great-grandson David Armstrong-Jones, 2nd Earl of Snowdon (the furniture designer and chairman of Christie's auction house).

Due to the large number of photographs taken of himself posing as a model for drawings, Boston-based journalist Susan Clare Zalkind has suggested that her great-great-great-grandfather, Sambourne, is the "grandfather of the selfie."

See also
Linley Sambourne House

References

Further reading

External links

 Portrait of Linley Sambourne by Harry Furniss
Linley Sambourne House
Sambourne's Illustrations from Punch in HeidICON
Sambourne's personal diary for 1906
 

1844 births
1910 deaths
English cartoonists
People from Pentonville
Sambourne, Linley
Place of death missing